Babinda Boulders, officially called the Boulders Scenic Reserve but known locally as Babinda Boulders or simply the Boulders, is a public recreation reserve managed by the Cairns Regional Council and adjacent to the Wooroonooran National Park in far north Queensland, Australia.

Description
The Boulders Scenic Reserve encompasses a section of Babinda Creek where several smaller tributaries join it. Most of the site, apart from the picnic and play areas adjacent to the main swimming hole, is covered by dense tropical rainforest. It lies in the foothills between Queensland's highest and second-highest mountain peaks – Mount Bartle Frere and Mount Bellenden Ker respectively. This high coastal mountain range, the tropical location and the moist south-easterly trade winds are responsible for making the coastal strip between Tully and Cape Tribulation the wettest area in all of Australia, and as a result a constant supply of cool mountain water flows through all the creeks of the reserve.

Location

Facilities
The site is well suited for families, boasting spacious and calm swimming holes with clear cool water year round, a picnic area with tables and free gas barbeques, toilets and showers, swings, grassed areas, viewing platforms, and walking tracks. There is also a free camping ground close by.

Walks

There are three walking tracks within the Boulders Reserve:
 Wonga Circuit Track: an easy  loop walk which takes one through rainforest alongside both North Babinda Creek and Babinda Creek. 
 Devil's Pool Walk: this  return walk takes the visitor alongside a lower section of Babinda Creek. There are two viewing platforms where the spectacular and dangerous rock formations may be observed.

Indigenous names
In the language of the local indigenous Yidinji people the area is called Bunna Binda meaning "waterfall" or "water over your shoulder". The town name "Babinda" is derived from the indigenous one. Wonga is a local indigenous family name. The original Yidinji name for Mt Bartle Frere is Chooreechillum.

Devil's Pool

The Devil's Pool is at the top of a perilous section of Babinda Creek. In the dry season the water in Babinda Creek passes over and under these rocks, sometimes disappearing from view altogether, while in the wet season the boulders are often completely covered. Regardless of the season, the rocks are treacherously slippery when wet and sadly many casual visitors have slipped into the stream and been dragged by the strong current to their deaths, while others have drowned while attempting to swim in the Devil's Pool.

Gallery

References

Babinda
Rainforests
Protected areas of Queensland